Adolph Göpel (29 September 1812 – 7 June 1847) was a German mathematician who wrote the first paper on hyperelliptic functions and who introduced Göpel tetrads.

Life and work 
His uncle was a diplomat so he attended his first mathematical lectures in Italy when he was 13. He entered the Humboldt University of Berlin in 1829 and received his doctorate in 1835. He did not correspond with many mathematicians, excepting August Leopold Crelle. After his death some of his works were published in Crelle's Journal.

References

Further reading 
 Burau, Biography in Dictionary of Scientific Biography (New York 1970-1990)
    

1812 births
1847 deaths
Humboldt University of Berlin alumni
People from Rostock
19th-century German mathematicians